Bilal Colony is a neighbourhood in the Korangi municipality of Karachi, Pakistan It was part of the Korangi Town borough until that was disbanded in 2011.

Healthcare
The inhabitants of Bilal Colony are exposed to severe health risks. The stink from the tanneries and refinery pollutes the environment by permeating the villages.

References

Neighbourhoods of Karachi
Korangi Town